The 16th Trampoline World Championships were held in Essen, Germany from 11 to 13 October 1990, only a few days after reunification of Germany.

Results

Men

Trampoline Individual

Trampoline Team

Trampoline Synchro

Double Mini Trampoline

Double Mini Trampoline Team

Tumbling

Tumbling Team

Women

Trampoline Individual

Trampoline Team

Trampoline Synchro

Double Mini Trampoline

Double Mini Trampoline Team

Tumbling

Tumbling Team

References
 Trampoline UK
 
 
 
 

Trampoline World Championships
Trampoline Gymnastics World Championships
International gymnastics competitions hosted by Germany
1990 in German sport